Napoleon at Saint Helena is a 1929 German silent historical film directed by Lupu Pick and starring Werner Krauss, Hanna Ralph, and Albert Bassermann. The film depicts the final years of Napoleon between 1815 and 1821 during his period of exile on the British Atlantic island of Saint Helena following his defeat at Waterloo.

It was shot at the EFA Studios in Berlin with location shooting in Marseille and St. Helena. The film's sets were designed by the art directors Erich Zander and Karl Weber.

Cast

References

Bibliography

External links

1929 films
Films of the Weimar Republic
German historical drama films
German silent feature films
1920s historical drama films
Films directed by Lupu Pick
Films set in the 1810s
Films set in the 1820s
Films about Napoleon
Films set on Saint Helena
Cultural depictions of Arthur Wellesley, 1st Duke of Wellington
Cultural depictions of Charles Maurice de Talleyrand-Périgord
Cultural depictions of Klemens von Metternich
Cultural depictions of Gebhard Leberecht von Blücher
German black-and-white films
1929 drama films
Silent historical drama films
1920s German films
Films shot at Halensee Studios
Films shot in Marseille
1920s German-language films